Parksdale is a census-designated place (CDP) in Madera County, California, United States. It is part of the Madera Metropolitan Statistical Area. The population was 3,234 at the 2020 census, up from 2,621 in 2010.

Geography
It is bordered to the northwest by the city of Madera, the county seat.

Demographics

2010
The 2010 United States Census reported that Parksdale had a population of 2,621. The racial makeup of Parksdale was 1,155 (44.1%) White, 56 (2.1%) African American, 65 (2.5%) Native American, 18 (0.7%) Asian, 3 (0.1%) Pacific Islander, 1,231 (47.0%) from other races, and 93 (3.5%) from two or more races. Hispanic or Latino of any race were 2,278 persons (86.9%).

The Census reported that 2,621 people (100% of the population) lived in households, 0 (0%) lived in non-institutionalized group quarters, and 0 (0%) were institutionalized.

There were 569 households, out of which 347 (61.0%) had children under the age of 18 living in them, 345 (60.6%) were opposite-sex married couples living together, 104 (18.3%) had a female householder with no husband present, 51 (9.0%) had a male householder with no wife present.  There were 52 (9.1%) unmarried opposite-sex partnerships, and 4 (0.7%) same-sex married couples or partnerships. 48 households (8.4%) were made up of individuals, and 13 (2.3%) had someone living alone who was 65 years of age or older. The average household size was 4.61.  There were 500 families (87.9% of all households); the average family size was 4.76.

The population was spread out, with 959 people (36.6%) under the age of 18, 335 people (12.8%) aged 18 to 24, 651 people (24.8%) aged 25 to 44, 502 people (19.2%) aged 45 to 64, and 174 people (6.6%) who were 65 years of age or older.  The median age was 25.4 years. For every 100 females, there were 111.2 males.  For every 100 females age 18 and over, there were 113.9 males.

The homeowner vacancy rate was 1.3%; the rental vacancy rate was 3.8%.  1,596 people (60.9% of the population) lived in owner-occupied housing units and 1,025 people (39.1%) lived in rental housing units.

2000
As of the census of 2000, there were 2,688 people, 594 households, and 513 families residing in the CDP. The racial makeup of the CDP was 32.11% White, 3.01% African American, 3.16% Native American, 0.07% Asian, 0.19% Pacific Islander, 53.91% from other races, and 7.55% from two or more races. Hispanic or Latino of any race were 81.77% of the population.

There were 594 households, out of which 55.2% had children under the age of 18 living with them, 61.1% were married couples living together, 16.3% had a female householder with no husband present, and 13.5% were non-families. 9.3% of all households were made up of individuals, and 3.9% had someone living alone who was 65 years of age or older.  The average household size was 4.53 and the average family size was 4.69.

In the CDP, the population was spread out, with 40.1% under the age of 18, 12.7% from 18 to 24, 26.4% from 25 to 44, 14.8% from 45 to 64, and 6.0% who were 65 years of age or older.  The median age was 23 years. For every 100 females, there were 110.3 males.  For every 100 females age 18 and over, there were 109.2 males.

The median income for a household in the CDP was $29,821, and the median income for a family was $28,287. Males had a median income of $26,181 versus $24,219 for females. The per capita income for the CDP was $7,129.  About 30.8% of families and 34.7% of the population were below the poverty line, including 41.3% of those under age 18 and 10.8% of those age 65 or over.

Government

References

Census-designated places in Madera County, California
Census-designated places in California